William Jacob Sasnett (April 29, 1820 – November 3, 1865) was an American educator and was the first President of East Alabama Mens College, now known as Auburn University, from 1858 to 1861.

Biography
William J. Sasnett was a graduate of Oglethorpe University in Atlanta, Georgia. He served as a Methodist clergyman. He was a professor at Oxford College, now known as Emory University. He became the first President of East Alabama Mens College, now known as Auburn University, from 1858 to 1861.

Bibliography
Progress: Considered With Particular Reference to the Methodist Episcopal Church, South (1956)

References

External links
 

1820 births
1865 deaths
Oglethorpe University alumni
Methodist ministers
Emory University faculty
Presidents of Auburn University
People of Alabama in the American Civil War
Auburn High School (Alabama) people